Hari Singh Mahua is a member of the Indian National Congress and vice president of the Rajasthan Pradesh Congress Committee. He also served as minister in the Government of Rajasthan. He was elected to the Rajasthan Legislative Assembly, representing the Mahuwa legislative constituency for a period  from 1980 to 2003.

References

Living people
Indian National Congress politicians
Rajasthani politicians
People from Dausa district
India MPs 1996–1997
Lok Sabha members from Rajasthan
People from Sikar district
Year of birth missing (living people)
Indian National Congress politicians from Rajasthan

[{Rajasthan assembly}-4 time mla (1980,1990,1993,1998)]